Mihail Kogălniceanu (1817–1891) was a Moldavian, later Romanian politician.

Mihail Kogălniceanu may also refer to:

Places in Romania
 Mihail Kogălniceanu, Constanța, a commune in Constanţa County
 Mihail Kogălniceanu, Ialomița, a commune in Ialomiţa County
 Mihail Kogălniceanu, Tulcea, a commune in Tulcea County
 Mihail Kogălniceanu, a village in Râmnicelu Commune, Brăila County
 Mihail Kogălniceanu, a village in Șuțești Commune, Brăila County
 Mihail Kogălniceanu, a village in Coțușca Commune, Botoşani County
 Mihail Kogălniceanu, a village in Smârdan Commune, Galaţi County
 Mihail Kogălniceanu, a village in Țigănași Commune, Iaşi County
 Mihail Kogălniceanu, a village in Arsura Commune, Vaslui County

Other uses
 Mihail Kogălniceanu International Airport, a Romanian airport and a United States Army base in Constanţa County
 NMS Mihail Kogălniceanu, a monitor of the Royal Romanian Navy
 Mihail Kogălniceanu-class river monitor